Pierre Girard may refer to:

 Pierre Girard (cardinal) (died 1415), French bishop and Cardinal
 Pierre-Simon Girard (1765–1836), French mathematician and engineer
 Pierre Girard (painter) (1806–1872), French painter
 Pierre Girard (sailor) (born 1926), Swiss sailor and Olympic medalist